Antonio "Tony" Soto (born April 6, 1973) is a Puerto Rican politician affiliated with the New Progressive Party (PNP). He was elected to the Puerto Rico House of Representatives in 2012 to represent District 6.

Soto was involved in a scandal during the 2012 PNP primaries, when it was revealed that there were some irregularities in the voting process at his District. Some of the irregularities involved Mayor of Guaynabo, Héctor O'Neill, forcing members of the municipal police to vote for him, instead of voting for his rival, incumbent Angel Pérez. In the end, Soto prevailed, preventing Pérez from running at the upcoming elections.

References

External links
Antonio Soto Profile on WAPA-TV

Living people
1973 births
New Progressive Party members of the House of Representatives of Puerto Rico
People from Bayamón, Puerto Rico